Must Be... Love is a 2013 Filipino coming-of-age romantic comedy film directed by Dado Lumibao, starring Kathryn Bernardo and Daniel Padilla. The film was shot in many locations in Cebu and Laguna in the Philippines. The film was produced by Star Cinema and was released nationwide on March 13, 2013.

This marks the first solo film with love tandem Kathryn Bernardo and Daniel Padilla in a leading role following their roles in the ensemble films 24/7 in Love and Sisterakas in 2012.

Synopsis 
"Must Be... Love" follows the love story of Patricia (Kathryn Bernardo), who is better known as "Patchot or Patch", and her childhood best friend, Ivan (Daniel Padilla). But what will Patchot do if she starts falling in love with her best friend? And what if Ivan only sees her as a 'best friend'? This problem will develop when another girl enters Ivan's life. Unfortunately for Patchot, it's her cousin Angel (Liza Soberano). Will Ivan fall in love with "Patchot" or will they remain as best friends forever?

Casts

Main Cast

Kathryn Bernardo as Princess Patricia "Patchot" Espinosa
Daniel Padilla as Ivan Lacson

Supporting Cast
 John Estrada as King Espinosa
 Liza Soberano as Angel Gomez
 Kate Lintag as Keisha Gomez
 Arlene Muhlach as Gwen Martinez
 John Lapus as Tita Baby
 Kakai Bautista as Dolly
 Janus Del Prado as Gordo
 Paul Salas as Jake
 Sharlene San Pedro as Lavinia
 Ramon Christopher as Tito Conde
 Kit Thompson as Nicco
 Allan Paule as Mang Badong
 Miguel Morales as Bok
 Cris Gabriel Queg as Bibap

Cameo Appearance 
 G. Toengi as Patchot's Mother 
 Enrique Gil as Dave (uncredited)
 Sofia Milla as young Patchot Espinosa 
 Kyle Banzon as young Ivan Martinez

Production

Music
"Nasa Iyo Na Ang Lahat", an entry in the 2013 songwriting competition Himig Handog P-Pop Love Songs originally recorded by Daniel Padilla, was used as the film's theme song. A mid-tempo version of the song was recorded by Sam Milby, which it was used in the trailer of the film and was also played in the film.

Release

Rating
The film was graded "B" by the Cinema Evaluation Board, and it received G rating by the MTRCB.

Critical reception
Jennifer Dugena of Philippine Entertainment Portal said Must Be.. Love was a recommended "perfect teen movie" and finished the review wrote , "Must Be Love is a rare film that is cute and light as much as it is serious and heavy, content-wise."

Box office
The film earned 61 million after almost 2 weeks of showing. This movie ended earning Php 113 million in the box-office.

See also
List of highest-grossing Filipino films in 2013

References

External links 

2013 films
Philippine coming-of-age films
Philippine romantic comedy films
2013 romantic comedy films
2010s Tagalog-language films
Star Cinema films
2010s English-language films